Charles Delange ( –1871) was a 19th-century French chansonnier.

He has written many songs of the nineteenth century repertoire as well as an operetta in 1856, Un monsieur bien servi! presented at Théâtre Déjazet.

Works 

 Les Aventures d'une cane, ditty curiosité musicale, music by Louis Clapisson, 1834
 Le Bureau de placement !, humorous scene, music by Charles-François Plantade, 1843
 Le Tombeau des secrets !, ditty, music by Plantade, 1843
 Beloiseau le modèle !, humorous scene, music by Pierre-Julien Nargeot, 1844
 Ce que disent les Cloches !, romance, music by Plantade, 1844
 Monsieur mon-filleul !, ditty, music by Nargeot, 1844
 Le Capitaine Craquefort !, voyage de circumdivagation, music by Plantade, 1846
 Le Galop de la vie !, music by Plantade, 1846
 Histoire de Cendrillon racontée par le caporal Gobin à son retour d' Afrique, sur l'air de Ramonez-ci, ramonez-là !, ditty, music by Plantade, 1846
 Le Souffleur du théâtre !, ditty with spoken ad libitum, music by Plantade, 1846
 Les Rues de Paris ou le nouveau conducteur parisien !, song, music by Plantade, 1846
 Riquet à la houppe ou l'avantage d'avoir du toupet !, on the tune of Cadet-Roussel est bon enfant, music by Plantade, 1846
 Le petit Chaperon rouge ou les vrais amis sont les gens impolis !, on the tune of Bonjour mon ami Vincent !, music by Plantade, 1846
 Les Désagréments, de Pyrame et Thisbe dans leurs amours !, on the tune of Catacoua, music by Parizot, 1847
 Le Jugement de Salomon ou l'enfant changé en nourrice, cause célèbre sur l'air de Allez-vous en, gens de la noce, music by Albert Clément, 1847
 Le petit Poucet ou l'art de s'enrichir !, music by Plantade, 1847
 Album de huit mélodies pour voix et piano, with Hippolyte Guérin, music by Clapisson, 1848
 Le Corricolo, music by Clapisson, 1848
 Ma Cunégonde ou l'heure du berger !, sérénade, music by Lhuillier, 1848
 La Tirelire à Jacquot, music by Clapisson, 1848
 Tout tourne au moulin, music by Clapisson, 1848
 La Poste aux Commissions ou les Relais d'hommes, scène comique, lyrics and music, 1848
 Album de dix mélodies pour voix et piano, with Xavier Eyma and Francis Tourte, 1849
 L'Ane-à-Baptiste ou Moucheron à la représentation du Prophète, parody on the tune of Catacoua, 1849
 Avez-vous vu mon Parapluie !, perquisition désespérée, music by Plantade, 1849
 Azor ou le bichon de la marquise !, ditty, music by Plantade, 1849
 Le Couvreur du Théâtre Français, ou Adrienne Lecouvreur, racontée par Mme Godiche, chanson comique on the tune of Nicodème, dans la lune ou l'autre pour la p'tit' Isabelle, 1849
 La Fée aux blonds cheveux !, fabliau, music by Lhuillier, 1849
 La Fête à Suzon !, song in three couplets, music by Lhuillier, 1849
 Le Mari au bal, duettino, 1849
 Pataud !, music by Lhuillier, 1849
 L'Âne savant ou le plus amoureux de la société !, music by Charles-François Plantade, 1850
 Le Nom de ta mère, music by Clapisson, 1850
 Le Perroquet indiscret !, ditty, music by Plantade, 1850
 Les Soupirs de Maclou !, ditty, music by Plantade, 1850
 Angélique et Médor, Épopée chevaleresque on the tune Il pleut, il pleut bergère, 1851
 Le Bout de l'oreille, fantaisie, on the tune j'ai vu la manière en passant, 1851
 Le Caporal aux ombres chinoises !, scène comique, 1851
 Le Furet du bois joli, ditty, 1851
 Le Marchand forain, air bouffe, music by Clapisson, 1851
 Si j'étais t'invisible !, ditty, music by  Lhuillier, 1852
 Le Bal des fleurs !, fabliau, music by Edmond Lhuillier, 1853
 Le Duel de Binochet !, ditty, music by Plantade, 1853
 Le Groom à la broche ou les abominations du château de Kercassbec !, ditty, music by Plantade, 1853
 L'Hirondelle du quartier ou la boite aux lettres !, music by Plantade, 1853
 Les Bâtons de vieillesse, story, 1854
 La Dot du berger Richard, ditty, music by Henrion, 1854
 La Mère aux Oiseaux, ditty, 1854
 Une Feuille de rose !, romance, music by Edmond Lhuillier, 1854
 Pierrot le poltron !, scène comique, music by Lhuillier, 1854
 Une Chaumière et son cœur, ditty, music by Émile Durand, 1855
 A bas les almanachs !, ditty, music by Émile Durand, 1856
 La fête de l'orpheline, romance, music by Durand, 1856
 Un monsieur bien servi!, operetta, music by Nargeot, 1856
 À la Houppe ! Là, houp, là ! Ou le coiffeur à la mode, music by Nargeot, 1857
 Les noms propres, ditty, music by Durand, 1857
 L'Arbre mort, melody, music by Durand, 1857
 Le Bonheur ignoré, romance, music by Durand, 1857
 La Boutique à Jean-Pierre, humorous ditty, music by Durand, 1857
 L'Écheveau de fil, bluette, music by Durand, 1857
 Une Femme à vapeurs ! Locomotive conjugale à haute pression, music by Parizot, 1857
 L'incomparable, Mirobolanpouff, parade charlatanesque, music by Vialon, 1857
 Jeanne s'amuse en chemin, ditty, music by Clapisson, 1857
 J'trouve ça bête ! (Petite revue pour rire), 1857
 Manon, Manette ! Lamentation champêtre, music by Parizot, 1857
 Othello et Desdémone !, duo bouffe, music by Henrion, 1857
 Le Père Pince-tout, garde champêtre !, humorous scene, music by Parizot, 1857
 Le Père Sabremioche ! Bousculade amicale d'un vieux grognard, music by Parizot, 1857
 Un Puits de mélodie !, ode-scène, music by Parizot, 1857
 La Vedette surprise, music by Durand, 1857
 L'Anglais champêtre !, humorous scene, music by Henrion, 1858
 Marchand de coco !, ditty, music by Parizot, 1858
 Capable de tout !, village ditty, music by Parizot, 1858
 Le Chevalier du lustre !, music by Parizot, 1858
 Cœur d'or, historiette, music by Henrion, 1858
 Une Âme au ciel, melody for soprano or tenor, music by Durand, 1858
 L'Homme machine vivant et respirant par le sifflet, music by Parizot, 1858
 Mr Grognon !, boutade humoristique, music by Parizot, 1858
 La Musique pour rire. Frontispice lyricocaricatural, music by Durand, 1858
 Plus d'Accidents ! Assurance universelle, music by Vialon, 1858
 Quand les poules auront des dents, music by Clapisson, 1858
 La Servante de Molière !, impressions dramatiques, music by Parizot, 1858
 Tout en Plan ! Plan net de notre planète, music by Parizot, 1858
 Le Toutou de Mylord !, complainte, music by Parizot, 1858
 Le Parrain d'une cloche. Carillon, music by Clapisson, 1859
 Un Chevau-léger du roi ou mon portrait d'autrefois, music by Parizot, 1859
 Le Crime de Lustucru !, cause célèbre, music by Parizot, 1859
 Heureux en Femmes !, ditty, music by Henrion, 1859
 Sur les bords de l'Ohio, chanson nègre, music by Parizot, 1859
 Ah ! Si, j'étais l' Amour !, music by Paul Henrion, 1860
 Le Biberon musical !, harmoni-pompe à jet continu, music by Antoine Vialon, 1860
 Le Docteur Moriko !, music by Robillard, 1860
 Philémon et Baucis !, humorous scene, music by Robillard, 1860
 Le Portrait de la grand'mère, music by Antoine-Louis Malliot, 1860
 Sœur Anne !, fantasy, music by Henrion, 1860
 Le Bas de Madeleine, romancette, music by Étienne Arnaud, 1861
 Ce que c'est que d'avoir un Nez !, ditty, music by Parizot, 1861
 Le Chemin de l'enfant, melody, music by Durand, 1861
 Coquelicot-ci coquelicot là, historiette, music by Émile Ettling, 1861
 Eh ! Dam ! L'on est ben Aise !, music by Robillard, 1861
 Madame Flafla ! Photographie d'une poupée, music by Parizot, 1861
 Madame Plumet et sa demoiselle !, humorous scene, music by Robillard, 1861
 Les Malheurs d'un hanneton !, bourdonnement musical, music by Parizot, 1861
 Les Mémoires d' une bergère !, confidence, music by Parizot, 1861
 Le Nid du berger !, music by Robillard, 1861
 L'Ognon de ma tante !, humorous scene, music by Parizot, 1861
 Le petit Chinois Joli ! Impressions de voyage, music by Parizot, 1861
 La Petite aux yeux bleus !, melody, music by Parizot, 1861
 V'la' c'que c'est qu' d'avoir des Yeux !, ditty, music by Parizot, 1861
 Les cent Amoureux de Suzon !, ditty, music by Olivier, 1862
 Charmaillou au cirque !, humoirous scene from Auvergne, music by Victor Robillard, 1862
 Le Dessus du panier !, ditty, music by Olivier, 1862
 Madame Batifol en Suisse, humorous scene, music by Ettling, 1862
 Le Marchand de parapluies !, ditty, music by Olivier, 1862
 Mes Yeux de 15 ans !, ditty, music by Robillard, 1862
 Mme Fontaine et Mr Robinet !, duet for a lonely man, music by Olivier, 1862
 Ordonnance, concernant les chiens (Protestation à 4 pattes), music by Olivier, 1862
 Le p'tit Marquis de la Gobinette, ou : Je n'en suis pas plus sur pour ça !, music by Robillard, 1862
 Quand on a tout perdu ! Consolations aux affligés, music by Robillard, 1862
 Quatre Hommes et un caporal ! Histoire d'une patrouille, music by Olivier, 1862
 La Romance du bœuf gras !, music by Olivier, 1862
 Saint Pierre ou les chefs du Paradis !, légende évangélique for barytone or bass, music by Olivier, 1862
 Le Valet de cœur !, humorous ditty, music by Moniot, 1862
 L'Amoureuse du régiment !, ditty, music by Olivier, 1863
 Un Baiser à la dame !, souvenirs, music by Victor Parizot, 1863
 Coco et la grise !, ditty, music by Robillard, 1863
 L'École buissonnière !, ditty, music by Olivier, 1863
 Le Fantassin malade ou les lieux qui m'ont vu naître !, exposé des besoins de la vie militaire, music by Olivier, 1863
 Les Gars normands !, ronde normande, music by Olivier, 1863
 Une Mouche sur le nez !, humorous ditty, music by Eugène Moniot, 1863
 La Princesse Finette !, ditty, music by Robillard, 1863
 Quand on a de Ça, ditty, music by Ettling, 1863
 Tic et couic ou la Noce de l'épicier !, balançoire, music by Olivier, 1863
 Le Vin tendre !, song, music by Olivier, 1863
 L'Anglais à marier !, humorous spoken song, music by Olivier, 1864
 La Chandelle !, scie, music by Olivier, 1864
 Comme y t' fait, fais-li !, proverbe, music by Olivier, 1864
 Adieu la Marguerite !, for mezzo-soprano, music by Louis Diémer, 1865
 Ça n'engage à rien !, ditty, music by August Olivier, 1865
 Aïe donc, mon Bidet !, ditty, music by Auguste Olivier, 1866
 Je ne sais plus, ce que je veux dire !, ditty, music by Olivier, 1866
 La Moutarde, ditty, music by Olivier, 1866
 L'Objet aimé !, première passion, music by Olivier, 1866
 Le Sergent bel œillet !, military ditty, music by Olivier, 1866
 Bonsoir, ma Biche !, ditty, music by Olivier, 1867
 Du Monde à dîner !, ditty, music by Olivier, 1867
 J'aime les cocottes, humorous ditty, music by Ettling, 1867
 Voilà l'Plaisir, Mesdames !, music by Lhuillier, 1868
 Les Amours en garnison !, ditty, music by Victor Robillard, 1872
 Le Sabot cassé !, ditty, set in music in 1907 by F. Bonoldi
 La Bavarde, ditty, undated

External links 
Charles Delange on Data.bnf.fr

French chansonniers
1871 deaths